Contra la Corriente may refer to:

 Contra la Corriente (Marc Anthony album), a 1997 salsa album
 Contra la Corriente (Noriega album), a 2004 reggaeton album
 Contra la Corriente (Janina album), a 2006 pop-rock album